Sock Chin Gouk is a research scientist with the Victorian Department of Environment and Primary Industries in Melbourne.

Early life and education 
Gouk was born in Batu Pahat, Johore, Malaysia. She attended Ai Chun Primary School, Temmengong Ibrahim Girls' School, and completed A-Levels (Cambridge) at Batu Pahat High School. She gained a first-class honours degree in horticultural science at Lincoln University, New Zealand, 1982. She then received a PhD in 1989 from Lincoln University for her work on plant pathogenic Pseudomonas spp..

Career 
In 1986, Gouk was appointed as a foundation Plant Pathologist with the New Zealand Ministry of Agriculture and Fisheries, based at Ruakura Research Centre, Hamilton, to establish plant pathology capabilities. She led research to improve understanding of the ecology, epidemiology and management of fungal and bacterial diseases of horticultural crops including pome fruit, stonefruit and kiwifruit. Her work on prediction of fire blight (Erwinia amylovora) has helped pomefruit growers to reduce application of antibiotic sprays. She then held the roles of project leader and program leader with the Horticulture and Food Crown Research Institute, New Zealand.

Gouk joined the Department of Natural Resources and Environment in 2001 as a Senior Plant Pathologist at Tatura Research Centre, Victoria, Australia. She led research on integrated management of bacterial blast of pomefruit and bacterial spot of stonefruit (Xanthomonas arboricola pv. pruni). Gouk currently works on projects to minimise the impact of diseases and food safety issues on the almond industry.

Gouk has been a reviewer for the New Zealand Pesticide Board, referee for the Foundation for Research Science and Technology (FoRST), referee for scientific journals: Plant Disease, European Journal of Plant Pathology, Australian Grape and Wine Research, and Australian Journal of Botany.

Awards 
 NZ-USA Collaborative Science Program Award (1997)
 MAF-Technology Senior Research Fellowships (1990, 1991)
 Trimble Agricultural Fellowship (1989)
 Prince and Princess of Wales Award (1989)
 University Grants Committee Postgraduate Scholarship (1982-1985)
 Wrightson Horticulture Industry Study Award (1983)
 FuChing Association University Scholarship (1978-1980)

References

External links 
 https://archive.today/20140814034721/http://au.linkedin.com/pub/chin-gouk/18/654/182

Australian women scientists
Australian pathologists
Phytopathologists
Living people
Year of birth missing (living people)
People from Batu Pahat
Malaysian emigrants to Australia
People who lost Malaysian citizenship